Braithwaite is a village in the northern Lake District, England.

Braithwaite may also refer to:

Places

Braithwaite railway station, a disused railway station in Braithwaite, England
Braithwaite Hall, a manor house in Coverdale, North Yorkshire, England
Braithwaite House, a historic house in Bentonville, Arkansas
Braithwaite, Louisiana, an unincorporated community in Plaquemines Parish, Louisiana
Braithwaite Memorial Specialist Hospital, a hospital in Port Harcourt

People

Braithwaite (surname), people with the surname
Braithwaite baronets, two baronetcies in the Baronetage of the United Kingdom

Businesses

Braithwaite & Co., a wholly owned subsidiary of Indian Railways
Braithwaite, Burn & Jessop Construction Company, a Public Sector Undertaking (PSU) of the Government of India

Other uses

 HMS Braithwaite, a Royal Navy Captain-class frigate in World War II